James Lee Stienke (born November 7, 1950) is a former American football defensive back in the National Football League (NFL). He was drafted by the Cleveland Browns in the second round of the 1973 NFL Draft. He also played for the New York Giants and Atlanta Falcons. He played college football at Texas State.

References

1950 births
Living people
Players of American football from Houston
American football cornerbacks
American football safeties
Texas State Bobcats football players
Cleveland Browns players
New York Giants players
Atlanta Falcons players